War in Pakistan may refer to:
Insurgency in Khyber Pakhtunkhwa
Insurgency in Balochistan
Indo-Pakistani wars and conflicts